Roberts' lechwe (Kobus leche robertsi) or Kawambwa lechwe is an extinct subspecies of lechwe.  It was found around Kawambwa, Zambia.

References

Extinct mammals of Africa
Mammal extinctions since 1500